Evangel Presbytery is a Presbyterian denomination, formed in 2019, by four churches. Two independent  churches, one church formerly from the Presbyterian Church in America, and one reformed baptist church formed the presbytery to protect the individual freedom of the churches regarding the doctrine of baptism, thus allowing the adhesion of churches paedobaptists and credobaptists.

Christian Terrorism 

The founding church of Evangel Presbytery is Trinity Reformed Church of Bloomington, Indiana.  This church was formerly named Church of the Good Shepherd and ClearNote Church. In 2013, ClearNote Church leader, Benjamin Curell, committed an act of Christian Terrorism attacking the local Planned Parenthood with an axe.  Curell was charged with a felony crime and told authorities he targeted Planned Parenthood because abortions were performed there.  Police said the man stated his intent was to damage the building because they “kill” and “murder” babies.  He told officers his actions were prompted by his religious beliefs.

History 

In 2019, a group of churches formed Evangel Presbytery under the leadership of Pastor Tim Bayly. The main cause of the formation of the denomination was the defense of the individual freedom of its churches regarding the doctrine of baptism. Therefore, both paedobaptist and credobaptist churches formed the Presbytery.

After its formation, the denomination continued to grow and plant new churches. In 2022 it was formed by 10 churches and congregations.

Doctrine 

The denomination subscribes to the Apostles' Creed, Nicene Creed, Athanasian Creed, Chalcedonian Creed, Westminster Confession of Faith, Westminster Larger Catechism and Westminster Shorter Catechism. Individual churches may hold to credobaptism or paedobaptism but must allow freedom of belief of members. The presbytery as a whole does not divide over timing or mode of baptism.

References

Presbyterian denominations in the United States
Presbyterian denominations established in the 21st century
Christian organizations established in 2019